Irek Khaydarovich Zinnurov (born 11 January 1969) is a Russian water polo player of Tatar origin who played on the silver medal squad at the 2000 Summer Olympics and the bronze medal squad at the 2004 Summer Olympics. He won four Russian titles as a captain of the Kazan club Sintez. After retirement from competitions, in 2010, he became its vice-president, and in 2011 its head coach.

Zinnurov is married to his schoolmate; they have a son Emil, who also plays water polo.

See also
 Russia men's Olympic water polo team records and statistics
 List of Olympic medalists in water polo (men)
 List of World Aquatics Championships medalists in water polo

References

External links
 

Russian male water polo players
1969 births
Living people
Water polo players at the 2000 Summer Olympics
Water polo players at the 2004 Summer Olympics
Olympic water polo players of Russia
Olympic silver medalists for Russia
Olympic bronze medalists for Russia
People from Yakutsk
Olympic medalists in water polo
Medalists at the 2004 Summer Olympics
Medalists at the 2000 Summer Olympics
Seventh convocation members of the State Duma (Russian Federation)